The Diseases of Animals Act is a series of acts of Parliament of the UK to deal with the possibility of the accrual of economic harm or intra-species contamination. It follows on from the 19th-century series notation Contagious Diseases (Animals) Act. The Act of 1884 was designed to combat "heavy losses" due to cattle diseases such as rinderpest, contagious bovine pleuropneumonia and foot-and-mouth disease (FMD). The series was consolidated by the Act of 1950. The Act of 1950 authorised the Ministry, when all other avenues of tuberculin prevention failed, to cull badgers, and to halt the transportation of cattle from herds prone to FMD. Apparently the definition of poultry needed to be extended in 1953, to include birds of the species psittaciformes, doves, peafowl and swans. The series was stopped and continued by the Animal Health Act 1981.

Diseases of Animals Act 1894
Diseases of Animals Act 1896
Diseases of Animals Act 1903
Diseases of Animals Act 1909
Diseases of Animals Act 1910
Diseases of Animals (Ireland) Act 1914
Diseases of Animals Act 1922
Diseases of Animals Act 1924
Diseases of Animals Act 1925
Diseases of Animals Act 1927
Diseases of Animals Act 1935
Diseases of Animals Act 1950
Diseases of Animals Act 1975

See also
Slaughter of Poultry Act 1967

References

Animal viral diseases
Animal virology
History of agriculture in the United Kingdom
Agricultural health and safety
Food law